HC Sfântu Gheorghe (also known as Imasa Sfântu Gheorghe) was an ice hockey team in Sfântu Gheorghe, Romania. Founded in 1973, they frequently played in the Romanian Hockey League, the top level of ice hockey in Romania. Their last appearance in the Romanian Hockey League came during the 2002-03 season, when they finished in fourth and last place in Group 2 of the league.

References

External links
Team profile on hockeyarenas.net
Team profile on eurohockey.com

Ice hockey teams in Romania
Sfântu Gheorghe
Ice hockey clubs established in 1973
Ice hockey clubs disestablished in 2003
1973 establishments in Romania
2003 disestablishments in Romania